Düsseldorf (often  in English sources; Low Franconian and Ripuarian: Düsseldörp ; archaic  ) is the capital city of North Rhine-Westphalia, the most populous state of Germany. It is the second-largest city in the state and the seventh-largest city in Germany, with a population of 644,280.

Düsseldorf is located at the confluence of two rivers: the Rhine and the Düssel, a small tributary. The -dorf suffix means "village" in German (English cognate: thorp); its use is unusual for a settlement as large as Düsseldorf. Most of the city lies on the right bank of the Rhine. Düsseldorf lies in the centre of both the Rhine-Ruhr and the Rhineland Metropolitan Region. It neighbours the Cologne Bonn Region to the south and the Ruhr to the north. It is the largest city in the German Low Franconian dialect area (closely related to Dutch).

Mercer's 2012 Quality of Living survey ranked Düsseldorf the sixth most livable city in the world. Düsseldorf Airport is Germany's fourth-busiest airport, serving as the most important international airport for the inhabitants of the densely populated Ruhr, Germany's largest urban area. Düsseldorf is an international business and financial centre, renowned for its fashion and trade fairs, and is headquarters to one Fortune Global 500 and two DAX companies. Messe Düsseldorf organises nearly one fifth of premier trade shows. As second largest city of the Rhineland, Düsseldorf holds Rhenish Carnival celebrations every year in February/March, the Düsseldorf carnival celebrations being the third most popular in Germany after those held in Cologne and Mainz.

There are 22 institutions of higher education in the city including the Heinrich-Heine-Universität Düsseldorf, the university of applied sciences (Hochschule Düsseldorf), the academy of arts (Kunstakademie Düsseldorf, whose members include Joseph Beuys, Emanuel Leutze, August Macke, Gerhard Richter, Sigmar Polke, and Andreas Gursky), and the university of music (Robert-Schumann-Musikhochschule Düsseldorf). The city is also known for its influence on electronic/experimental music (Kraftwerk) and its Japanese community. Düsseldorf is classified as a GaWC Beta+ world city.

History

Early development
When the Roman Empire was strengthening its position throughout Europe, a few Germanic tribes clung on in marshy territory off the eastern banks of the Rhine. In the 7th and 8th centuries, the odd farming or fishing settlement could be found at the point where the small river Düssel flows into the Rhine. It was from such settlements that the city of Düsseldorf grew.

The first written mention of Düsseldorf (then called Dusseldorp in the local Low Rhenish dialect) dates back to 1135. Under Emperor Friedrich Barbarossa the small town of Kaiserswerth to the north of Düsseldorf became a well-fortified outpost, where soldiers kept a watchful eye on every movement on the Rhine. Kaiserswerth eventually became a suburb of Düsseldorf in 1929. In 1186, Düsseldorf came under the rule of the Counts of Berg. 14 August 1288 is one of the most important dates in the history of Düsseldorf. On this day the sovereign Count Adolf VIII of Berg granted the village on the banks of the Düssel town privileges. Before this, a bloody struggle for power had taken place between the Archbishop of Cologne and the count of Berg, culminating in the Battle of Worringen. 

The Archbishop of Cologne's forces were wiped out by the forces of the count of Berg who were supported by citizens and farmers of Cologne and Düsseldorf, paving the way for Düsseldorf's elevation to city status, which is commemorated today by a monument on the Burgplatz. The custom of turning cartwheels is credited to the children of Düsseldorf. There are variations of the origin of the cartwheeling children. Today the symbol (Der Radschläger) represents the story and every year the Düsseldorfers celebrate by having a cartwheeling contest. After this battle the relationship between the four cities deteriorated, because they were commercial rivals; it is often said that there is a kind of hostility between the citizens of Cologne and Düsseldorf. Today, it finds its expression mainly in a humorous form (especially during the Rhineland Karneval) and in sports. 

A market square sprang up on the banks of the Rhine and the square was protected by city walls on all four sides. In 1380, the dukes of Berg moved their seat to the town and Düsseldorf was made regional capital of the Duchy of Berg. In 1609, the ducal line of the United Duchies of Jülich-Cleves-Berg died out, and after a virulent struggle over succession, Jülich and Berg fell to the Wittelsbach Counts of Palatinate-Neuburg, who made Düsseldorf their main domicile, even after they inherited the Electorate of the Palatinate, in 1685, becoming now Prince-electors as Electors Palatine. 

Under the art-loving Johann Wilhelm II (r. 1690–1716), a vast art gallery with a huge selection of paintings and sculptures, were housed in the Stadtschloss (city castle). After his death, the city fell on hard times again, especially after Elector Charles Theodore inherited Bavaria and moved the electoral court to Munich. With him he took the art collection, which became part of what is now the Alte Pinakothek in Munich. Destruction and poverty struck Düsseldorf after the Napoleonic Wars. Napoleon made Berg a Grand Duchy and Düsseldorf its capital. Johann Devaranne, a leader of Solingen's resistance to Napoleon's conscription decrees, was executed here in 1813. After Napoleon's defeat, the whole Rhineland including Berg was given to the Kingdom of Prussia in 1815. The Rhine Province's parliament was established in Düsseldorf.  By the mid-19th century, Düsseldorf enjoyed a revival thanks to the Industrial Revolution as the city boasted 100,000 inhabitants by 1882; the figure doubled in 1892.

World War I
During World War I the Royal Naval Air Service (RNS) undertook the first Entente strategic bombing missions on 22 September 1914, when it bombed the Zeppelin bases in Düsseldorf.

Weimar Republic
In 1920, Düsseldorf became the centre of the General Strike. On 15 April 1920, 45 delegates of the German Miners Union were murdered by the Freikorps.

World War II
The Rabbi of the Düsseldorf Jewish Community fled to the Netherlands and died in KZ Auschwitz in 1943. The city was a target of strategic bombing during World War II, particularly during the RAF bombing campaign in 1943 when over 700 bombers were used in a single night. Raids continued late into the war. As part of the campaign against German oil facilities, the RAF raid of 20–21 February on the Rhenania Ossag refinery in the Reisholz district of the city halted oil production there. The Allied ground advance into Germany reached Düsseldorf in mid-April 1945. The United States 97th Infantry Division easily captured the city on 18 April 1945, after the local German Resistance group launched Aktion Rheinland.

German Federal Republic
In 1946, Düsseldorf was made capital of the new federal state of North Rhine-Westphalia. The city's reconstruction proceeded at a frantic pace and the economic transformation guided Düsseldorf's economic growth.

Geography

Physical geography

Düsseldorf lies at the centre of the Lower Rhine basin, where the delta of the Düssel flows into the Rhine. The city lies on the east side of the Rhine, except District 4 (Oberkassel, Niederkassel, Heerdt and Lörick).
Across the Rhine, the city of Neuss stands on the delta of the Erft. Düsseldorf lies southwest of the Ruhr urban area, and in the middle of the Rhine-Ruhr metropolitan region.

Düsseldorf is built entirely on alluvium, mud, sand, clay and occasionally gravel.

Adjacent cities and districts
The following districts and cities border Düsseldorf (clockwise starting from the north): the City of Duisburg, the District of Mettmann (Ratingen, Mettmann, Erkrath, Hilden, Langenfeld, and Monheim), and the District of Neuss (Dormagen, Neuss, and Meerbusch).

Climate
The city has an oceanic climate (Köppen: Cfb, mild in relation to East Germany). Like the rest of the lower Rhineland, Düsseldorf experiences moderate winters with little snowfall and mild to warm summers. The dominant wind direction is from the west with velocities in the range of 3 to 4 m/s (7–9 mph), with gusts of 3.5 −4.8 m/s (8–10.7 mph). The wind is calm (defined as being under 2 m/s or 4.5 mph) about 35% of the time, more frequently at night and in the winter.

Demographics

With a population of 612,178 within the city boundaries (31 December 2015), Düsseldorf is Germany's seventh largest city. Its population surpassed the threshold of 100,000 inhabitants during the height of industrialisation in 1882, and peaked at just over 705,000 in 1962. The city then began to lose residents with many moving into neighbouring municipalities. However, since the late 1990s, the city's population has been slowly rising again.

A total of 109,883 (18%) of Düsseldorf's population are foreigners (31 December 2008), the majority of whom come from within Europe (81,742). The largest national minorities are Turks, Greeks, and Poles. Düsseldorf and its surroundings have the third-largest Japanese community in Europe and the largest in Germany (about 11,000 people). Düsseldorf has the third-largest Jewish community in Germany, with about 7,000 members.

Government

Boroughs

Since 1975, Düsseldorf is divided into ten administrative boroughs. Each borough (Stadtbezirk) has its own elected borough council (Bezirksvertretung) and its own borough mayor (Bezirksvorsteher). The borough councils are advisory only. Each borough is further subdivided into quarters (Stadtteile). There are 50 quarters in Düsseldorf.

Mayor

The current Mayor of Düsseldorf is Stephan Keller of the Christian Democratic Union (CDU), who was elected in 2020.

The most recent mayoral election was held on 13 September 2020, with a runoff held on 27 September, and the results were as follows:

! rowspan=2 colspan=2| Candidate
! rowspan=2| Party
! colspan=2| First round
! colspan=2| Second round
|-
! Votes
! %
! Votes
! %
|-
| bgcolor=| 
| align=left| Stephan Keller
| align=left| Christian Democratic Union
| 83,425
| 34.1
| 118,308
| 56.0
|-
| bgcolor=| 
| align=left| Thomas Geisel
| align=left| Social Democratic Party
| 64,203
| 26.3
| 92,999
| 44.0
|-
| bgcolor=| 
| align=left| Stefan Engstfeld
| align=left| Alliance 90/The Greens
| 42,463
| 17.4
|-
| bgcolor=| 
| align=left| Marie-Agnes Strack-Zimmermann
| align=left| Free Democratic Party
| 30,584
| 12.5
|-
| bgcolor=| 
| align=left| Florian Josef Hoffmann
| align=left| Alternative for Germany
| 6,564
| 2.7
|-
| bgcolor=| 
| align=left| Udo Adam Bonn
| align=left| The Left
| 5,257
| 2.2
|-
| bgcolor=| 
| align=left| Dominique Mirus
| align=left| Die PARTEI
| 3,039
| 1.2
|-
| bgcolor=| 
| align=left| Mark Schenk
| align=left| Volt Germany
| 2,255
| 0.9
|-
| 
| align=left| Claudia Krüger
| align=left| Animal Welfare Here!
| 1,939
| 0.8
|-
| bgcolor=| 
| align=left| Hans-Joachim Grumbach
| align=left| Free Voters
| 1,192
| 0.5
|-
| 
| align=left| Celine Coldewe
| align=left| Climate List Düsseldorf
| 954
| 0.4
|-
| bgcolor=| 
| align=left| Michael Baumeister
| align=left| Independent
| 947
| 0.4
|-
| bgcolor=| 
| align=left| Marc Olejak
| align=left| Pirate Party Germany
| 792
| 0.3
|-
| 
| align=left| Markus Brakonier
| align=left| German Sport Party
| 383
| 0.2
|-
| bgcolor=| 
| align=left| Andre Maniera
| align=left| The Republicans
| 325
| 0.1
|-
! colspan=3| Valid votes
! 244,322
! 98.8
! 211,307
! 99.3
|-
! colspan=3| Invalid votes
! 3,008
! 1.2
! 1,571
! 0.7
|-
! colspan=3| Total
! 247,330
! 100.0
! 212,878
! 100.0
|-
! colspan=3| Electorate/voter turnout
! 470,511
! 52.6
! 470,312
! 45.3
|-
| colspan=7| Source: State Returning Officer
|}

City council

The Düsseldorf city council (Düsseldorfer Stadtrat) governs the city alongside the Mayor. The most recent city council election was held on 13 September 2020, and the results were as follows:

! colspan=2| Party
! Votes
! %
! +/-
! Seats
! +/-
|-
| bgcolor=| 
| align=left| Christian Democratic Union (CDU)
| 81,833
| 33.4
|  3.3
| 30
|  1
|-
| bgcolor=| 
| align=left| Alliance 90/The Greens (Grüne)
| 58,881
| 24.0
|  10.3
| 22
|  11
|-
| bgcolor=| 
| align=left| Social Democratic Party (SPD)
| 43,949
| 17.9
|  11.4
| 16
|  8
|-
| bgcolor=| 
| align=left| Free Democratic Party (FDP)
| 22,453
| 9.2
|  2.2
| 8
|  2
|-
| bgcolor=| 
| align=left| The Left (Die Linke)
| 9,951
| 4.1
|  1.1
| 4
| ±0
|-
| bgcolor=| 
| align=left| Alternative for Germany (AfD)
| 8,776
| 3.6
|  0.6
| 3
|  1
|-
| bgcolor=| 
| align=left| Volt Germany (Volt)
| 4,512
| 1.8
| New
| 2
| New
|-
| bgcolor=| 
| align=left| Die PARTEI (PARTEI)
| 4,371
| 1.8
| New
| 2
| New
|-
| 
| align=left| Animal Welfare Here! (Tierschutz hier!)
| 3,437
| 1.4
| New
| 1
| New
|-
| bgcolor=| 
| align=left| Free Voters (FW)
| 2,212
| 0.9
|  0.3
| 1
| ±0
|-
| 
| align=left| Climate List Düsseldorf (Klimaliste)
| 2,124
| 0.9
| New
| 1
| New
|-
| colspan=7 bgcolor=lightgrey| 
|-
| bgcolor=| 
| align=left| Pirate Party Germany (Piraten)
| 1,464
| 0.6
|  1.1
| 0
|  1
|-
| 
| align=left| German Sport Party (DSP)
| 642
| 0.3
| New
| 0
| New
|-
| bgcolor=| 
| align=left| The Republicans (REP)
| 586
| 0.2
|  0.4
| 0
|  1
|-
| 
| align=left| RESISTANCE 2020 We for Düsseldorf
| 76
| 0.0
| New
| 0
| New
|-
! colspan=2| Valid votes
! 245,271
! 99.2
! 
! 
! 
|-
! colspan=2| Invalid votes
! 2,085
! 0.8
! 
! 
! 
|-
! colspan=2| Total
! 247,356
! 100.0
! 
! 90
!  8
|-
! colspan=2| Electorate/voter turnout
! 470,511
! 52.6
!  3.4
! 
! 
|-
| colspan=7| Source: State Returning Officer
|}

Economy

Düsseldorf has become one of the top telecommunications centres in Germany. With two of the four big German providers of mobile frequencies, D2 Vodafone and E-Plus, Düsseldorf leads the German mobile phone market. There are many foreign information and communication technology companies in Düsseldorf such as Huawei, NTT, Ericsson, Oppo, Vivo and Xiaomi. There are 18 internet service providers located in the capital of North Rhine-Westphalia. There are two airlines with headquarters in the city: Eurowings and formerly independent LTU International.

Many of the internet companies in Düsseldorf have their roots in the world of advertising: there are 400 advertising agencies in Düsseldorf, among them three of the largest in Germany: BBDO Group, Grey Global Group and Publicis. A number of affiliates of foreign agencies deserve mention as well, such as Ogilvy & Mather, Dentsu, Hakuhodo, TBWA, and DDB. There are also about 200 publishing houses in Düsseldorf.

Peek & Cloppenburg (fashion); Uniper (electricity generation); L'Oréal Germany (Cosmetics and Beauty); Henkel AG & Co. KGaA (Branded Consumer Goods and Industrial technologies); Metro (wholesale, retail); Ceconomy (retail); Esprit Holdings (fashion, headquarters in Ratingen near Düsseldorf); BASF Personal Care & Nutrition (formerly Cognis – chemicals, headquarter in Monheim near Düsseldorf, but production mainly in Düsseldorf).

Daimler AG builds the Mercedes-Benz Sprinter light commercial vehicles in Düsseldorf.
Since the 1960s, there has been a strong relationship between the city and Japan. Many Japanese banks and corporations have their European headquarters in Düsseldorf – so many that Düsseldorf has the third largest Japanese community in Europe, after London and Paris.

The "Kö", which stands for Königsallee ("King's Avenue"), is a shopping destination. Some jewellery shops, designer labels, and galleries have their stores here. The Kö has among the highest rents for retail and office space in Germany.

Financial center 
The city is an important financial center. More than 30,000 people work for the financial and insurance sector in Düsseldorf. There are around 170 national and international financial institutions, and about 130 insurance agencies, and one of Germany's eight stock exchanges. HSBC has its German headquarter in Düsseldorf and employs 3.000 people. NRW.BANK is a development bank of the State of North Rhine-Westphalia and the largest state development bank in Germany. NRW.BANK was spun off from WestLB in 2002. Today Deutsche Bank and Commerzbank have major branches in Düsseldorf with about 2.000 employees. Düsseldorf is also the most important German financial center for Japanese credit institutions. MUFG Bank, SMBC and Mizuho have their German headquarters in Düsseldorf. Also Santander has its German headquarters in the Düsseldorf region. Some major insurance companies like ERGO, a subsidiary of Munich Re, and ARAG are located in the city. Several other major financial service companies have their headquarters in the city.

Media
Important newspapers and journals such as Handelsblatt, Rheinische Post, Wirtschaftswoche, Deutsches Wirtschaftsblatt and VDI-Nachrichten are published in Düsseldorf. Almost all of these papers are available online. Renowned filmmaking companies, such as Germany's biggest cinema enterprise, the Riech Group, and TV channels such as WDR and QVC are located in Düsseldorf. The Film- und Medienstiftung NRW foundation supports the production of film and new media.

With regard to movies and movie theatres in Düsseldorf, moviegoers are able to view movies in a range of different languages. Many mainstream movies are shown in English, Spanish, French, and German.

Transport

Düsseldorf Airport

There is a long-distance train station served by regional and national services, which is linked to the airport by the SkyTrain, an automatic people mover. Another station situated under the terminal building carries the S-Bahn line (S11) to Düsseldorf Central Station, and to Cologne as well as a few selected night services.
After those of Frankfurt, Munich and Berlin, Düsseldorf Airport is Germany's third largest commercial airport, with 25.5 million passengers annually (2019). The airport offers 180 destinations on 4 continents, and is served by 70 airlines. The airport buildings were partly destroyed by a devastating fire caused by welding works in 1996, killing 17 people. It was completely rebuilt and the Skytrain installed.

Railway

The city is a major hub in the Deutsche Bahn (DB) railway network. More than 1,000 trains stop in Düsseldorf daily. Düsseldorf Central Station at Konrad-Adenauer-Platz is located in Düsseldorf-Stadtmitte. Several Rhein-Ruhr S-Bahn lines connect Düsseldorf to other cities of Rhine-Ruhr. Local Düsseldorf Straßenbahn and light rail Düsseldorf Stadtbahn traffic, as well as local bus traffic, is carried out by the city-owned Rheinbahn which operates within the VRR public transport system. The light rail system also serves neighbouring cities and is partially operated underground. The Central Station and the Airport Station (Flughafen-Bahnhof) are connected to the national and European high-speed systems (Intercity/Eurocity, IC/EC and InterCityExpress).

Taxi

In Düsseldorf there are 1320 officially licensed Taxis. According to the regulations, the cars are always in ivory colour. On the back window you always find a black number on a yellow patch. Credit card payment has to be accepted at the Taxi stands at Airport of Düsseldorf.
The supply of taxis in Düsseldorf is over the German average. Two taxi organisations cover the market. "Taxi-Düsseldorf" offers more than 1180 cabs in different sizes for max. 8 Passengers. The smaller one is "Rhein-Taxi" with more than 120 cabs. It is obligatory to carry out any journeys to destinations in the city and directly neighbouring cities.

Carsharing
In addition to stationary car sharing, where vehicles must be returned to their original location after use, one-way carsharing vehicles have also been available for hire since 2012. These vehicles, which can be parked anywhere where parking is normally allowed within Düsseldorf, can be rented from Car2go, Greenwheels, Stadtmobil and DriveNow.

Autobahn
North Rhine-Westphalia has the densest network of autobahns in Germany and Düsseldorf is directly accessible via the A3, A44, A46, A52, A57, A59 and A524.

Cycling
Düsseldorf is connected to some national and international cycling paths, including EV15 The Rhine Cycle Route.

The city of Düsseldorf is a member of the German North Rhine-Westphalia District, Municipality and City Friends of Pedestrians and Cyclists Working Group, who bestowed upon Düsseldorf the title of "Friend of Cyclists City" in 2007, although the city still has a few gaps in the network of cycle paths in the eyes of many of its citizens.

Culture and recreation

Elector Jan Wellem and his wife Anna Maria Luisa de' Medici of Tuscany, were patrons of Düsseldorf's first significant cultural activities in the 17th and 18th centuries. Heinrich Heine, whose 200th birthday was celebrated in 1997 and who originally had a proposed memorial in the city dedicated to him; Clara and Robert Schumann; and as Felix Mendelssohn, are the most prominent artists related to the city, which is home to a distinguished Academy of Fine Arts.

The Düsseldorf cultural scene comprises traditional and avant-garde, classical and glamorous. The world-famous state art collection of North Rhine-Westphalia, the highly acclaimed Deutsche Oper am Rhein (opera), and the Düsseldorfer Schauspielhaus (theatre), artistic home of Gustaf Gründgens, are major elements of Düsseldorf's reputation as a centre of the fine arts.

Beer

Düsseldorf is well known for its Altbier, a hoppy beer which translates as old [style] beer, a reference to the pre-lager brewing method of using a warm top-fermenting yeast like British pale ales. Over time the Alt yeast adjusted to lower temperatures, and the Alt brewers would store or lager the beer after fermentation, leading to a cleaner, crisper beer. The name "altbier" first appeared in the 19th century to differentiate the beers of Düsseldorf from the new pale lager that was gaining a hold on Germany.

Brewers in Düsseldorf used the pale malts that were used for the modern pale lagers, but retained the old ("alt") method of using warm fermenting yeasts. The first brewery to use the name Alt was Schumacher which opened in 1838. The founder, Mathias Schumacher, allowed the beer to mature in cool conditions in wooden casks for longer than normal, and laid the foundation for the modern alt – amber coloured and lagered. The result is a pale beer that has some of the lean dryness of a lager but with fruity notes as well.

There are five pub-breweries in Düsseldorf which brew Altbier on the premises: Füchschen, Schumacher, Schlüssel, Uerige and Brauerei Kürzer. Four of the five are in the historic centre of Düsseldorf (Altstadt); the other (Schumacher), between the Altstadt and Düsseldorf Central railway station (Hauptbahnhof), also maintains an establishment in the Altstadt, Im Goldenen Kessel, across the street from Schlüssel.

Each (except Brauerei Kürzer) produces a special, secret, seasonal "Sticke" version in small quantities, though the names vary: Schlüssel spells it "Stike", without the "c", while Schumacher calls its special beer "Latzenbier", meaning "slat beer", possibly because the kegs from which it was poured had been stored on raised shelves. Füchschen's seasonal is its Weihnachtsbier (Christmas beer), available in bottles starting mid-November, and served in the brewpub on Christmas Eve.

Music and nightlife

Since the 1950s the "Kom(m)ödchen" has been one of the most prominent political cabarets of Germany. The city's best-known contribution to the culture of modern popular music is the influential avant-garde electronic band Kraftwerk. Formed by a few Düsseldorf-born musicians, Kraftwerk is internationally known as the most significant band in the history of post-war German music and as pioneers in electronic music. Other influential musical groups originating from Düsseldorf include Neu!, formed in 1971 by Klaus Dinger and Michael Rother, after their split from Kraftwerk, and La Düsseldorf, also formed by Dinger in 1976 shortly after Neu! disbanded. Both groups had a significant influence on a variety of subsequent rock, post-punk, and electronic music artists.

Internationally known power metal band Warlock was formed in Düsseldorf in 1982. Its frontwoman, Doro Pesch, had a successful solo career in Europe and Asia since Warlock ended. The punk band Die Toten Hosen, which is famous around the world, also the most popular singers  in Germany Westernhagen and Heino come from Düsseldorf. The electronic act D.A.F. was formed in the city in 1978, as well as the electronic/industrial pioneers Die Krupps in 1980. Another famous formation is Fehlfarben. Founded in the late 1970s by Peter Hein, Frank Fenstermacher, Kurt Dahlke and Michael Kemner.

Düsseldorf appears in several songs, including Düsseldorf by the British indie band Teleman and Wärst du doch in Düsseldorf geblieben by Danish singer Dorthe Kollo.

Fashion 
Düsseldorf has been the fashion capital of Germany for decades (it is also a major cultural center for the art and fashion scenes). Berlin, Germany's 'fashion capital' until 1945, lost its position because of its special location within the Soviet occupation zone. After the monetary reform of June 20, 1948, fashionable clothes trends gained importance. Igedo organised fashion shows staged in Düsseldorf starting in March 1949.

There are a number of schools dedicated to fashion design in Düsseldorf, among them Akademie Mode & Design (de), Design Department, and Mode Design College.

Carnival

One of the biggest cultural events in Düsseldorf is the Karneval (also referred to as the "fifth season") which starts every year on 11 November at 11:11 a.m., and reaches its climax on Rosenmontag (Rose Monday), featuring a huge parade through the streets of Düsseldorf. Karneval ends on Aschermittwoch (Ash Wednesday).

Düsseldorf's cartwheeler

The Düsseldorfer Radschläger (boy who does cartwheels) is said to be the city's oldest tradition. The symbol of the cartwheeler can be found on souvenirs and various things in Düsseldorf have cartwheelers to thank for their names.

Legends of its origin and history 

The tradition cannot be linked to one specific historical event. Instead, there are several stories surrounding the beginnings of the Düsseldorf cartwheelers. Probably the most well known version is the Battle of Worringen. In the battle of 1288, Count Adolf devastatingly defeated the Archbishop of Cologne. As a consequence of this victory, Düsseldorf obtained town privileges. Inhabitants, especially children, ran joyfully on the streets and performed cartwheels.

Another story talks about a wedding procession during which one of the wheels of the wedding carriage broke. In order to fend off the threat of bad luck, a boy supposedly jumped up to the carriage, took hold of the wheel and thus became a living part of the wheel. Whether the story is about the marriage of Jan Wellem and Anna Maria Luisa de' Medici or the wedding of Margravine Jakobea of Baden and Johann Wilhelm is debatable.

Another story gives an account of the wedding between Margrave Jacobe von Baden and Johann Wilhelm, in 1585. According to legend, she felt miserable about her marriage, but the cartwheelers who displayed their skills next to her carriage were able to make her smile. Numerous travelers were attracted to the city by great exhibitions – the forerunner of today's fairs – between the end of the 19th century and the beginning of the 20th century. During this time the children who did cartwheels found out that it was a profitable source of income. The bourgeoisie accepted this in good humour as a symbolic act of local patriotism. In the beginning the lads shouted "för eene Penning schlage ich das Rad“ (a cartwheel for a penny). The Jan Wellem monument returned to Düsseldorf at the end of the Second World War. The procession was accompanied by torches, fanfares and cartwheeling boys.

Cartwheelers in the cityscape
Cartwheelers can be found at several fountains within the city and near many small landmarks. The most famous is Cartwheeler's Fountain in Burgplatz (de) with an inscription of a quote by Hans Müller-Schlösser: "Radschläger wolle mer blieve, wie jeck et de Minschen och drieve" (We will always remain cartwheelers, however crazy it drives people.) The fountain was designed by Alfred Zschorsch in 1954 and donated by Heimatverein Düsseldorfer Jonges, which is a club devoted to the maintenance of local and regional traditions. There are other cartwheelers that decorate storm drains and the door knocker on the Church of Lambertus, designed by Friedrich Becker. He created the cartwheeler in front of the Schadow Arcades. 

The tradition has been kept alive by the Alde Düsseldorfer Bürgergesellschaft von 1920 e. V., a society founded in 1920, which organized the first cartwheeler competition on 17 October 1937. This event has been held annually since 1971 in cooperation with the Stadtsparkasse (a local bank). Formerly held in the Königsallee, it has taken place since 2006 on the Rheinwerft, near the old part of town. This is a fixed date in the city’s calendar of events. About 500 boys regularly participate in the event and girls have also taken part since 1971. In an art project Radschläger-Kunst (Cartwheeler Art) launched in 2001, over 100 cartwheeler sculptures were designed by various artists. They were positioned around the city centre. Some of the sculptures have been auctioned off to companies and private owners.

Christmas market 
Every Christmas, the city of Düsseldorf uses the city centre to host one of the largest Christmas gatherings in Germany. The Christmas festival occurs every year from 17 November until 23 December. This Christmas fest brings Düsseldorf a large portion of tourism every year as many people from nearby areas come to the city to drink mulled wine and hot chocolate and watch craftsman blow glass and create art. The event contains many small wooden buildings all clustered in the middle of the city for all the citizens to enjoy. The event, to many visitors, has an old European feel, but is very lively.

Cuisine

Traditional meals in the region are Rheinischer Sauerbraten (a beef roast and sometimes horse marinated for a few days in vinegar and spices served with gravy and raisins) and Heaven and Earth (Himmel und Äd; black pudding with stewed apples mixed with mashed potatoes). In winter the people like to eat Muscheln Rheinischer Art (Rhenish-style mussels) as well as Reibekuchen (fried potato pancake served with apple sauce). Also a special meal: Düsseldorfer Senfrostbraten (Steaks roasted with Düsseldorf mustard on top).

Düsseldorf is known for its strong Dijon-like mustard served in a traditional pot called "Mostertpöttche", which was eternalised in a still life by Vincent van Gogh in 1884.

The Rhine Metropolis is one of the most diverse areas in terms of culinary diversity. Düsseldorf, with the third largest Japanese community in Europe, not only provides a wide range of culinary cuisine but also has a solid foundation of Authentic Asian food in the city. Düsseldorf's exceptional culinary cuisine has been recognized and visited by the Worldwide leading travel guide of Lonely Planet. Along with a broad range of diverse cultural cuisine, Düsseldorf is also home to various Michelin starred restaurants that are world renowned.

Halve Hahn – this dish is made from a half a double rye roll, which is another of the specialties of Düsseldorf, buttered, with a thick slice of aged Gouda cheese, onions, mustard, ground paprika and sour pickles.

Himmel un Aad – a dish of mashed potatoes and apples along with slices of blutwurst. Caramelized onions are usually served with this meal.

Reibekuchen is another famous dish from Düsseldorf; this dish is usually drizzled with Rübensyrup (beet syrup) and is served on pumpernickel slices along with applesauce.

Literature
The Förderpreis für Literatur der Landeshauptstadt Düsseldorf is a German Literary award donated by the City of Düsseldorf in Northrhine-Westphalia. The Prize for Literature in support of the City of Düsseldorf is awarded since 1972 by the Council of the City due to the decisions of the courts.

The Förderpreis für Literatur der Landeshauptstadt Düsseldorf is given once a year to artists and groups, especially to the areas of poetry, writing, review and translation.

Rivalry with Cologne

Düsseldorf and Cologne have had a "fierce regional rivalry". The rivalry includes carnival parades, football, ice hockey and beer. People in Cologne prefer Kölsch while people in Düsseldorf prefer Altbier. Some Waiters and patrons will "scorn" and make a "mockery" of people who order Alt beer in Cologne and Kölsch in Düsseldorf. The rivalry has been described as a "love-hate relationship".

Theatres

 Apollo (varieté, circus; shows do not require knowledge of German language)
 Capitol (musicals)
 Deutsche Oper am Rhein (Opera; Ballet)
 Düsseldorfer Schauspielhaus; the theatre started with theatrical performances in 1585
 Düsseldorfer Marionetten-Theater
 Merkur Spiel-Arena (Venue of the Eurovision Song Contest 2011)
 FFT – Forum Freies Theater (intimate theatre)
 Junges Theater in der Altstadt
 Klangraum (20th-century classical music)
 Kom(m)ödchen (Political cabaret)
 Komödie Düsseldorf
 Palais Wittgenstein
 Puppentheater an der Helmholtzstraße (puppetry)
 Robert-Schumann-Saal
 Savoy-Theater
 Seniorentheater in der Altstadt
 Tanzhaus NRW (theatre for dance)
 Tonhalle Düsseldorf (concert hall for classical music, jazz, pop, cabaret)
 Theater an der Kö
 Theater an der Luegallee
 Theateratelier Takelgarn
 Theater Flin
 Theater Glorreich

Museums, arts and history institutes, and other attractions

 Akademie-Galerie (exhibition space of the Art Academy Düsseldorf)
 Andreaskirche
 Aquazoo-Löbbecke-Museum (aquarium and zoological museum)
 TvTower
 BRAUSE – Vereinsheim des Metzgerei Schnitzel Kunstvereins e.V.
 Film museum
 Filmstiftung NRW (NRW Film Foundation)
 Forum NRW
 Goethe-Museum
 Heinrich-Heine-Institut
 Heinrich Heine Birth-house
 Hetjens Museum (German museum of ceramics)
 Imai – inter media art institute
 Institut Français Düsseldorf
 Institut für Kunstdokumentation und Szenografie (Institute for Art Documentation and Scenography)
 Julia Stoschek Collection (video art)
 KAI 10|Raum für Kunst
 Kulturbahnhof Eller
 Kunstarchiv Kaiserswerth (works of Bernd and Hilla Becher/Kahmen Collection)
 Kunst im Tunnel (KIT)
 Kunstsammlung Nordrhein-Westfalen (Art Collection Northrhine-Westphalia) – K20 (Grabbeplatz) and K21 (Ständehaus)
 Kunsthalle Düsseldorf
 Kunstverein für die Rheinlande und Westfalen (Society for the Promotion of the Fine Arts)
 Museum Kunstpalast
 Mahn- und Gedenkstätte für die Opfer des Nationalsozialmus (Memorial museum for victims of Nationalsocialism)
 Onomato
 Polnisches Institut Düsseldorf
 Puppentheater an der Helmholtzstraße
 Rathaus
 Reinraum e.V. – Verein zur Förderung von Kunst und Kultur
 Rheinturm (Rhine Tower; highest building and landmark of Düsseldorf)
 
 Schiffahrt Museum
 Schloss Jägerhof
 Schlossturm
 Schloss und Park Benrath (Palace and park of Benrath)
 Stadtbibliothek
 Stadtmuseum (City history museum)
 Statue of Jan Wellem
 Theatermuseum, Düsseldorf
 Triton Museum
 Volkshochschule
 Zakk – cultural centre with concerts, readings, debates and party

Parks and gardens
 Botanischer Garten Düsseldorf, a modern botanical garden
 Hofgarten
 The Nordpark, with the Aquazoo
 The Südfriedhof (The South Cemetery)
Volksgarten adjacent to Südpark

Sports and live events

Düsseldorf's main football team Fortuna Düsseldorf won the 1933 German championship, the German Cup in 1979 and 1980, and were finalists in the European Cup Winners Cup in 1979. They currently play in the 2. Bundesliga, after being relegated from the Bundesliga in 2020. They play their matches in the Merkur Spiel-Arena (formerly known as the 'ESPIRIT arena'), a multi-functional stadium with a capacity of 54,500. Düsseldorf was one of nine host cities for the 1974 FIFA World Cup, and the Rochusclub Düsseldorf has hosted the tennis World Team Cup from 1978 till 2012.
Düsseldorf also held the Grand Départ for the Tour de France in July 2017.

Other sports in Düsseldorf are ice hockey (the Düsseldorfer EG which play in the new ISS-Dome) and American football. The Düsseldorf Panther are one of the most successful teams in Germany with six German Bowl titles and the Eurobowl victory in 1995. In addition the Junior-Team is the most successful youth department in Germany with fifteen Junior Bowl victories. Rhine Fire Düsseldorf was an established team of the NFL Europe and won the World Bowl two times in 1998 and 2000. Düsseldorf has a successful rugby union team (Düsseldorf Dragons), who as of 2017/18 play in the western division of the 2. Bundesliga, the second tier of German rugby.

Table tennis is also played (Borussia Düsseldorf – the most successful team in Germany with Timo Boll), as are handball (HSG Düsseldorf), basketball (Düsseldorf Giants), baseball (Düsseldorf Senators) and dancing (Rot-Weiß Düsseldorf). Düsseldorf also has a Cricket team, the Düsseldorf Blackcaps, who play in the regional NRW league.

The city hosted the Eurovision Song Contest 2011.

Education
Heinrich Heine University Düsseldorf is located in the southern part of the city.
It has about 30,000 students and a wide range of subjects in natural sciences, mathematics, computer sciences, philosophy, social sciences, arts, languages, medicine, pharmacy, economy and the law.

Other academic institutions include
 the Clara Schumann Musikschule (music school)
 the Robert Schumann Hochschule
 the Kunstakademie Düsseldorf (Academy of Fine Arts) which is famous for high-profile artists like Joseph Beuys, Paul Klee, Nam June Paik, Gerhard Richter, the Bechers, and Andreas Gursky
 the Hochschule Düsseldorf (University of Applied Sciences)
 the AMD Academy of Fashion and Design
 the Max Planck Institute for Iron Research
 the Goethe Institute
 Verwaltungs- und Wirtschafts-Akademie Düsseldorf
 WHU – Otto Beisheim School of Management (Düsseldorf Campus)

International primary and secondary schools:
International School of Düsseldorf
Lycée français de Düsseldorf
Japanische Internationale Schule in Düsseldorf

Notable buildings

Rheinturm (TV tower) the city's landmark (1982: ,), the lights of which comprise the world's largest digital clock.
The Gehry buildings in the Düsseldorf media harbour (see picture above).
The Colorium, an 18-storey tower designed by Alsop and Partners, also in the Düsseldorf media harbour.
The Benrather Schloss (Benrath palace).
 The Grupello-Haus probably designed by the Italian architect  in 1706 for Duke Johann Wilhelm.
The Wilhelm Marx House of 1922/24: at twelve storeys high, it was Germany's first high-rise building.
The Stahlhof of 1906, the administrative centre of Germany's steel economy until 1945.
The Stummhaus of 1925, another early German high-rise building.
Gerresheim Basilica.
.
Hotel Römischer Kaiser, built in 1903-04
DRV Tower,  tower constructed in 1978.
GAP 15, an  building constructed in 2005 near Königsallee.
Eight bridges span the Rhine at Düsseldorf; they, too, are city landmarks.
Eastern pylon of Reisholz Rhine Powerline Crossing, an electricity pylon under whose legs runs a rail.
 Johanneskirche, Düsseldorf

Notable places
 Königsallee, a shopping street with luxuries shops
Schloss Benrath, rococo castle
Altstadt (Düsseldorf), literally "old town", the historic town centre with the town hall Altes Rathaus from 1573. Nowadays Düsseldorf's entertainment district with hundreds of pubs and restaurants, and proverbially known by Germans as "the longest bar in the world".
Düsseldorf-Hafen, the harbour is a modern build district
Kaiserswerth, historical district with the ruined castle of Barbarossa Frederick I, Holy Roman Emperor
Schloss Heltorf, the biggest palace in Düsseldorf, since 1662 homestead of the noble family Grafen von Spee
Hofgarten, old city park
Schloss Jägerhof, an old hunting lodge at the Hofgarten, today a Goethe Museum

Twin towns – sister cities

Düsseldorf is twinned with:

 Reading, England, UK (1988)
 Chemnitz, Germany (1988)
 Haifa, Israel (1988)
 Warsaw, Poland (1989)
 Chongqing, China (2004)
 Palermo, Italy (2016)
 Chiba Prefecture, Japan (2019)
 Chernivtsi, Ukraine (2022)
 Moscow, Russia (1992) Suspended due to the 2022 Russian invasion of Ukraine

Friendship and cooperation
Düsseldorf also cooperates with:

 Toulouse, France (2003)
 Tenerife, Spain (2003)
 Shenyang, China (2004)
 Guangzhou, China (2006)
 Montreal, Canada (2015)

Notable people

Born before 1850

Anne Of Cleves (1515–1557), Married to Henry VIII
François-Charles de Velbrück (1719–1784), Prince-Bishop of Liège
Helena Curtens (1722–1738), last victim of the witch trials in the Lower Rhine
Johann Georg Jacobi (1740–1814), writer
Friedrich Heinrich Jacobi (1743–1819), philosopher and writer
Peter von Cornelius (1783–1867), painter
Heinrich Heine (1797–1856), poet and writer
Lorenz Clasen (1812–1899), painter
Wilhelm Camphausen (1818–1885), painter
Louise Strantz (1823–1909), composer and singer
Paul von Hatzfeldt (1831–1901), diplomat
Anton Josef Reiss (1835–1900), sculptor
Eugen Richter (1838–1906), politician and publicist
Arnold Forstmann (1842–1914), landscape painter
Peter Janssen (1844–1908), painter, professor at the Art Academy
Karl Rudolf Sohn (1845–1908), painter
Felix Klein (1849–1925), mathematician

Born 1851–1900

Georg Wenker (1852–1911), linguist, founder of linguistic atlas of the German Reich (Wenkeratlas)
Karl Janssen (1855–1927), sculptor, professor at the Art Academy
Leopold Graf von Kalckreuth (1855–1928), painter
Maria Countess von Kalckreuth (1857–1897), painter
Fritz Reiss (1857–1915), lithographer, illustrator, graphic artist and painter
Bruno Schmitz (1858–1916), architect
Otto Hupp (1859–1949), signature graphic artist, engraver
Albert Herzfeld (1865–1943), painter and author
Agnes Elisabeth Overbeck (1870–1919), composer and pianist
Hanns Heinz Ewers (1871–1943), writer and filmmaker
Wilhelm Levison (1876–1947), historian
Elly Ney (1882–1968), world-famous concert pianist
Carl Maria Weber (1890–1953), writer
Willy Reetz (1892–1963), painter, "Düsseldorf School"
Hermann Knüfken (1893–1976), marine soldier, revolutionary, union activist, resistance fighter and secret agent
Ludwig Gehre (1895–1945), officer and resistance fighter
Hans Globke (1898–1973), jurist, National Socialist, from 1949 Assistant Secretary, then Secretary of State in the Federal Chancellery (1953–1963)
Karl von Appen (1900–1981), stage designer

Born after 1900

Max Lorenz (1901–1975), tenor
Toni Ulmen (1906–1976), motorcycle and car race driver
Karl Pschigode (1907–1971), actor and theatre director
Helmut Käutner (1908–1980), film director and actor
Hilarius Gilges (1909–1933), Afro-German actor, victim of Nazism
Ernst Klusen (1909–1988), musicologist
Luise Rainer (1910–2014), actress
Ursula Benser (1915–2001), painter
Fred Beckey (1923–2017), rock climber, mountaineer, author
Jürgen Habermas (born 1929), philosopher and sociologist
Carl-Ludwig Wagner (1930–2012), politician (CDU)
Wim Wenders (born 1945), filmmaker, playwright, author
Carmen Thomas (born 1946), journalist, radio and television presenter, author and lecturer
Marius Müller-Westernhagen (born 1948), actor and musician
Heiner Koch (born 1954), Roman Catholic bishop
Andreas Gursky (born 1955), photographer
Bettina Böttinger (born 1956), TV-presenter
Birgitt Bender (born 1956), politician (The Greens), Member of Landtag and Bundestag
Tommi Stumpff (born 1958), musician
Bettina Hoffmann (born 1959), musician and musicologist
Andreas Frege (born 1962), "Campino", singer in the band Die Toten Hosen
René Obermann (born 1963), manager, husband of Maybrit Illner
Doro Pesch (born 1964), heavy metal musician
Jörg Schmadtke (born 1964), football manager
André Olbrich (born 1967), guitarist in the band Blind Guardian
Michael Preetz (born 1967), footballer
Svenja Schulze (born 1968), politician (SPD)
Heike Makatsch (born 1971), actress and singer
Tetsuya Kakihara (born 1982), voice actor and singer
Erika Ikuta (born 1997), Japanese actress, a former member of Nogizaka46

Associated with Düsseldorf
William Thomas Mulvany (1806–1885 in Düsseldorf), entrepreneur
Robert Schumann (1810–1856), composer, 1850–1854 urban music director in Düsseldorf
Alfred Rethel (1816–1859 in Düsseldorf), history painter
Christian Eduard Boettcher (1818–1889), painter who lived, worked and died in Düsseldorf
Clara Schumann (1819–1896), pianist and composer, wife of Robert Schumann, frequent host of Johannes Brahms in Düsseldorf (1850–1854)
Emanuel Leutze (1824–1868), painter, Düsseldorf School
Louise Dumont (1862–1932 in Düsseldorf), actress and 1904 founder of the Schauspielhaus Düsseldorf
Johanna "Mother" Ey (1864–1947 in Düsseldorf), gallery owner
Peter Behrens (1868–1940), architect and director of the Düsseldorf Art Academy
Wilhelm Kreis (1873–1955), architect and director of the School of Applied Arts Düsseldorf
Peter Kürten (1883–1931), called "The Vampire of Düsseldorf", committed in Düsseldorf during the period between February and November 1929 series of sexual homicide
Adolf Uzarski (1885–1970 in Düsseldorf), writer, painter and graphic artist
Emil Fahrenkamp (1885–1966), architect and director of Düsseldorf Art Academy 1937–1945
Betty Knox (1906–1963), dancer with variety act Wilson, Keppel and Betty and war correspondent lived in the city during her later years and died there.
Ernest Martin (born 1932), theatre director, theatre manager and actor in Düsseldorf

See also

Japan Day in Düsseldorf
OPENCities
2017 Düsseldorf axe attack

References

Bibliography

External links

Wikidus.de The Wiki for Düsseldorf
Düsseldorf Official English website of the city
visitduesseldorf.de Official Düsseldorf Tourist Board
dusseldorf.guide  Unofficial Düsseldorf Guide 
Düsseldorf City Panoramas

The Lost City WW2 Bomb Damage 1942/3

 
German state capitals
Populated places on the Rhine
Rhineland
Districts of the Rhine Province